Chandragupta may refer to:

People 
 Chandragupta Maurya, Indian Emperor, Mauryan Empire, 320–298 BCE
 Chandragupta I, Indian king, Gupta Empire, 320-335 CE
 Chandragupta II (died 410s), also known as Chandragupta Vikramaditya, Indian emperor, Gupta Empire, 375-415 CE

Arts and entertainment 
Devichandraguptam, ancient Indian drama by Vishakhadatta about Chandragupta II
 Chandragupta Maurya (2011 TV series), a 2011 Indian historical drama
 Chandragupta Maurya (2018 TV series), a 2018 Indian historical drama
 Chandragupta (board game), a board wargame
 Chandragupta (play), 1911 Indian drama by Dwijendralal Ray about Chandragupta Maurya
 Chandragupta (film), a 1934 Indian historical film about Chandragupta Maurya